Helen and Leonard Moretz Stadium is an 8,500-seat stadium located in Hickory, North Carolina. It serves as home to the Lenoir-Rhyne University Bears of the South Atlantic Conference. Moretz Stadium is the fourth oldest stadium in continuous use in NCAA Division II and one of the oldest in the country, built in 1924. Games played there are said to be played "between the bricks" as the walls separating the seating area from the field are made up of brick, which have been a part of the design of the stadium since it opened in 1924. 

The Stadium currently serves as the home field for the L-R football and men's and women's lacrosse teams and also houses the University's spring commencement exercises. The Lenoir-Rhyne baseball team also used the facility as its home field until a baseball-specific ground was built across the street.

In 1960, it was the site for the NAIA National Semifinal football game, which Lenoir-Rhyne won on its way to its only national championship in school history. Moretz Stadium was also home of a 1962 NAIA National Semifinal game and an NCAA Division II Semifinal game in 2013. The stadium has hosted four NCAA Playoff games in its history, all of which came in either 2012 or 2013.

A July 2019 assessment discovered problems with the structural integrity of the home stand, as a result of the findings the university has decided to tear down the stand and replace it with a temporary stand for the 2019 season. The school will build a permanent replacement in 2020.

References

External links
 Lenoir-Rhyne University - Facilities

College football venues
College lacrosse venues in the United States
Lenoir–Rhyne Bears football
Hickory, North Carolina
American football venues in North Carolina
Defunct college baseball venues in the United States
Lacrosse venues in North Carolina
Sports venues in North Carolina
Sports venues completed in 1924
1924 establishments in North Carolina